Tamara Kotevska (born 9 August 1993) is a Macedonian filmmaker best known for her 2019 documentary Honeyland.

Early life
Kotevska was born in Prilep, Republic of Macedonia (now North Macedonia). She earned a scholarship to study abroad in Tennessee for her junior year in high school. She graduated from the Faculty of Dramatic Arts at the Sts. Cyril and Methodius University in Skopje, with an emphasis in documentary film.

Career
Together with Ljubomir Stefanov, Kotevska spent three years in Bekirlija, North Macedonia filming the documentary about a female wild beekeeper, Hatidze. The film was originally going to be a documentary short about the Bregalnica river region when they came across the beekeeper. Kotevska and Stefanov previously worked together on another documentary, Lake of Apples (2017).

Honeyland won three awards at the 2019 Sundance Film Festival and received two nominations at the 92nd Academy Awards: Best Documentary Feature and Best International Feature Film. It is the second Macedonian film to earn an Oscar nomination after Before the Rain (1994).

References

External links

1993 births
Living people
People from Prilep
Macedonian documentary filmmakers
Macedonian film directors
Women documentary filmmakers
Ss. Cyril and Methodius University of Skopje alumni
Sundance Film Festival award winners